Largin Castle is a contour hillfort and scheduled monument in Cornwall, England, presumed to date from the Iron Age.

The hillfort has an outer rampart and ditch enclosure with an entrance at its south. Within this, a smaller inner oval enclosure, also defined by ramparts and ditch, is offset to the north and occupies some 3/4 of the interior. A linear earthwork thought to be associated with the hillfort is found at the south-west, at the  contour, running for approximately  first due north, and then north-north-west.

The castle enclosure is overgrown by an ancient oak woodland; coniferous planting surrounds the site. The Atlas of Hillforts specifies the condition of the site as good.

Largin Castle was listed as a Scheduled Monument in June 2020.

References

Hill forts in Cornwall
Scheduled monuments in Cornwall